Manjit Singh, popularly known as Manjit Rupowalia (Punjabi: ਮਨਜੀਤ ਰੁਪੋਵਾਲਿਆ) is a Punjabi singer-songwriter and actor from India.
He is a legend singer 
He has 3 brothers and 2 sisters

Discography

Awards 
  ‘Appreciation Award’ from ‘Member of Parliament, Brampton, Canada’ in July 2009 
  ‘Punjab Cultural Promotion Event’ from Vancouver, B.C., Canada on 8 June 2008
 Participation award in ‘The Guinness Book of World Records’ in August 2012, United Kingdom.
  Award of Honour from ‘Shri Guru Ravi Dass Community Center’, Burnaby, B.C., Canada in June 2008
 Best performance Award in ‘Vaisakhi Mela 2008’ in New York City
 Maan Punjab Da Award’ in Italy in year 2010

References 

"Pant Mein Gun Diljit Dosanjh Manjit Rupowalia

External links 
 Official Facebook Page
 Manjit Rupowalia All Songs List On iPendu
 All Listed Google Stories

Year of birth missing (living people)
Living people